Fall of the Despised is the third studio album released by the brutal death metal band Severe Torture in 2005. It was recorded in the Netherlands by producer Hans Pieters. It is the first album to feature guitarist Marvin Vriesde.

Track listing 
Endless Strain of Cadavers - 04:06
Sawn Off - 04:14
Unconditional Annihilation - 03:37
Consuming the Dying - 04:27
Impulsive Mutilation - 04:56
Dead from the Waist up - 03:31
Decree of Darkness - 03:47
Enshrined in Madness - 05:21
End of Christ - 05:11
Fall of the Despised - 01:15

Personnel
Dennis Schreurs – vocals 
Thijs van Laarhoven – rhythm guitar 
Patrick Boleij – bass 
Seth van de Loo – drums 
Marvin Vriesde – lead guitar

Severe Torture albums
2005 albums
Earache Records albums